Teock Creek is a stream in the U.S. state of Mississippi.

Teock is a name derived from the Choctaw language meaning "pine".

References

Rivers of Mississippi
Rivers of Smith County, Mississippi
Mississippi placenames of Native American origin